Deoni is a town and administrative centre  of Deoni Taluka in Latur subdivision of Latur district in the Indian state of Maharashtra. Deoni has a total area of 415.32 sq.km.

A deoni cattle breeding farm was  initiated by the Durrani brothers, who were also renowned advocates of the erstwhile princely state of Hyderabad, and their father Shahzadah Gulab Muhammad Khan Durrani Abdali. The name Deoni was given to this town when it was given as a Jāgīr (a feudal grant of land) to the Durrani brother's father, Shahzadah Gulab Muhammad Khan Durrani Abdali, by VI Nizam of Hyderabad Mahboob Ali Khan upon arriving at Hyderabad from Kandahar, Afghanistan; in addition, he was appointed as Mansabdar of Maharatwada region. He was also the fourth direct descendants of His Majesty Ahmed Shah Abdali of Afghanistan- founder of Durrani Empire.
Physical and morphological characteristics viz. good milk yielders and draught animals, the Deoni is considered as an important dual-purpose breed of cattle. It is claimed that it has been developed from a strain descended from a mixture of Gir, Dangi and local cattle (Dongarpatti).It is found in three
colour variations, viz. Wanera (clear white with black colour at both the sides of the face), Balankya (clear white colour body) and Shevera (white body with irregular black spots). The body is moderately developed and symmetrical with distinct muscles

Demographics
In the 2001 Indian census, the village of Deoni recorded 11,276 inhabitants. In the 2011 census, Deoni had 18,793 households and a  population of 97,598.
Deoni cattle are being maintained at Cattle BreedingFarm, College of Veterinary and Animal Sciences, Udgir (MAFSU), Maharashtra; Deoni Cattle Breeding
Farm, Gudgaripalli, Andhra Pradesh; Govt Farm, Kampasagar, Andhra Pradesh and Livestock Research and Information Centre (Deoni), Hallikhed (B), KVAFSU,
Bidar, Karnataka.

References

Neighbourhoods in Latur
Latur district
Villages in Latur district
Talukas in Maharashtra
Cities and towns in Latur district
Villages in Deoni taluka